Cristian de Jesús Mejía Martínez (born 11 October 1990, in Barranquilla) is a former Colombian football midfielder.

Honours
Atlético Junior
Categoría Primera A: 2011–II

References

External links
 Profile at goal.com
 
 
 

1990 births
Living people
Colombian footballers
Colombia under-20 international footballers
Deportes Tolima footballers
FC Politehnica Timișoara players
Peñarol players
Danubio F.C. players
Atlético Junior footballers
Envigado F.C. players
Tecos F.C. footballers
Atlético Huila footballers
Uniautónoma F.C. footballers
Colombian expatriate footballers
Expatriate footballers in Uruguay
Expatriate footballers in Romania
Colombian expatriate sportspeople in Romania
Expatriate footballers in Mexico
Categoría Primera A players
Liga I players
Association football midfielders
Association football forwards
Footballers from Barranquilla